Jeff Pogue (born April 23, 1981) is an American politician who served as a member of the Missouri House of Representatives for the 143rd district from 2013 to 2021. He is a member of the Republican party.

References

Living people
Republican Party members of the Missouri House of Representatives
1981 births
21st-century American politicians
People from Rolla, Missouri
People from Salem, Missouri